Peterborough—Kawartha (formerly Peterborough) is a provincial electoral district in Ontario, Canada, that has been represented in the Legislative Assembly of Ontario since 1934.

It now consists of the City of Peterborough and the municipalities of Douro-Dummer, Trent Lakes, Havelock-Belmont-Methuen, North Kawartha and Selwyn plus the Curve Lake First Nation. Before 2018, it consisted of the County of Peterborough, excluding the townships of North Kawartha, Galway-Cavendish and Harvey and Cavan-Millbrook-North Monaghan.

The riding has voted for the party that has won the most seats in every election since 1977.

As part of the 2015 electoral redistribution, the district was renamed Peterborough—Kawartha. It lost the Townships of Otonabee-South Monaghan, Asphodel-Norwood, and the Hiawatha First Nation, while subsequently gaining the townships of Trent Lakes and North Kawartha. The 2018 election is the first with the new boundaries.

Members of Provincial Parliament

Partial election results

2007 electoral reform referendum

Sources

Elections Ontario Past Election Results
Map of riding for 2018 election

Ontario provincial electoral districts
Politics of Peterborough, Ontario